The Castoro Sei (Italian for Beaver Six) is a column stabilized semi-submersible pipelay vessel.

The Castoro Sei is equipped with 2 rotating gantry cranes 134 tonnes capacity, three 130 tonnes pipe tensioners and a 400 tonnes abandon and recovery winch for pipelaying. She provides accommodation for 354 people.

The firing line comprises the fixed pipelay ramp, enclosed in the central housing, running along the longitudinal centreline of the vessel. It is connected to an internal and external ramp, both of which have adjustable inclination to facilitate pipelay in varying water depths. A ramp extension unit is available for use in deep water or for severe seabed conditions.

The Castoro Sei was built in 1978 by Fincantieri at Trieste yard, and is owned and operated by Saipem.  Her port of registry is Nassau, Bahamas.

It has been used for laying a number of pipelines in the Black Sea, North Sea and Mediterranean Sea, including Blue Stream, Greenstream, Medgaz, Trans-Mediterranean, Europipe II, and BBL pipelines.  The vessel also laid most of the Nord Stream 1 pipeline in the Baltic Sea.

References 

1978 ships
Ships built in Italy
Crane vessels
Semi-submersibles
Pipe-laying ships
Ships built by Fincantieri